The 2017–18 season will be Bradford City's 115th season in their history, in the Football League and in the English football league system. Along with League One, the club will also compete in the FA Cup, EFL Cup and EFL Trophy.
The season covers the period from 1 July 2017 to 30 June 2018.

Pre-season
As of 13 July 2017, Bradford City have announced seven pre-season friendlies against Guiseley, Sunderland,
Newcastle United, FC Halifax Town, Bradford Park Avenue, TV Echterdingen  and Eccleshill United.

League One

League table

Result summary

Matches
On 21 June 2017, the fixtures for the forthcoming season were announced.

FA Cup
In the FA Cup, Bradford City were drawn at home to Chesterfield for the first round, Plymouth Argyle also at home in the second round and either Port Vale or Yeovil Town away in the third round. The latter won their replayed match 3–2  to host the Bantams.

EFL Cup
On 16 June 2017, Bradford City were drawn at home to Doncaster Rovers in the first round.

EFL Trophy
On 12 July 2017 the group stage draw was completed with Bradford City facing Chesterfield, Manchester City U23 and Rotherham United. After winning their group, Bradford City were drawn at home to either Oldham Athletic or Fleetwood Town.

Squad Statistics

Statistics accurate as of 5 May 2018

Transfers

Transfers in

Transfers out

Loans in

Loans out

References

Bradford City A.F.C. seasons
Bradford City